Japan participated in the 1986 Asian Games held in Seoul, South Korea from September 20 to October 5, 1986. This country was ranked 3rd with 58 gold medals, 76 silver medals and 77 bronze medals with a total of 211 medals to secure its third spot in the medal tally.

References

Nations at the 1986 Asian Games
1986
Asian Games